Street Days (translit. Kuchis dgeebi) is a 2010 Georgian drama film directed by Levan Koguashvili. The film was selected as the Georgian entry for the Best Foreign Language Film at the 83rd Academy Awards, but didn't make the final shortlist.

Cast
 Guga Kotetishvili - Chekie
 Zura Begalishvili - Lado
 Gaga Chikhladze - Gurami
 Eka Chkheidze - Zaza's Wife
 Levan Jividze - Vaso
 Paata Khetaguri - Ero
 Dato Kinghuradze - Maca
 Giorgi Kipshidze - Jaba
 Rusiko Kobiashvili - Nini
 Zaza Kolelishvili - Sano
 Irakli Loladze - Givi
 Nikoloz Marri - Nika
 Tamriko Melikishvili - Luiza
 Irakli Ramishvili - Ika
 Zaza Salia - Tengo
 Zura Sharia - Zaza Cheishvili
 Merab Yolbaia - Dito

Reviews
“…in the gritty, low-key realism of its strong performances, "Street" finds an absorbing mix of comic anguish and twisted hope—especially in the devastating self-knowledge of Kotetishvili's gaze.” – The Hollywood Reporter

“Georgian cinema has a new star in director Levan Koguashvili, whose superb neorealist drama, "Street Days," is just the calling card the beleaguered country needs. Stylistically and thematically reminiscent of new Romanian cinema, the pic plumbs the contentious, corrupt and crumbling social landscape of Georgia's capital, Tbilisi, while following a down-at-the-heels heroin addict struggling to protect a friend's son from corrupt cops. Lensed with impressive assurance and boasting powerful perfs from a combo of established pros and non-pros, "Street Days" looks poised to lead a Georgian renaissance spearheaded by fests and advancing into the arthouse circuit.” –Variety

“Levan Koguashvili’s feature debut is a well-crafted, hard-edged look at life in contemporary Tbilisi which is much more refined and profound than the scenes of ethnic strife which 24-hour-news organisations loop from Georgia.” –Screen Daily

“Mr. Koguashvili and his director of photography, Archil Akhvlediani, use the narrow streets and weathered buildings of Tbilisi, the Georgian capital, to great pictorial effect.” –The New York Times

Awards
Rotterdam International Film Festival - Tiger Award
Edinburgh Film Festival - Rosebud Section
goEast Film Festival - Golden Lily, Best Film
Montreal World Film Festival - Focus on World Cinema
European Film Festival Palić - Tolerance Award

See also
 List of submissions to the 83rd Academy Awards for Best Foreign Language Film
 List of Georgian submissions for the Academy Award for Best Foreign Language Film

References

External links

2010 films
2010s Georgian-language films
2010 drama films
Drama films from Georgia (country)